The men's hammer throw at the 1960 Summer Olympics took place on September 2 (qualifying) and September 3 (final) at the Stadio Olimpico. There were 28 competitors from 18 nations. The maximum number of athletes per nation had been set at 3 since the 1930 Olympic Congress. The event was won by Vasily Rudenkov of the Soviet Union, the nation's first victory in the event. Gyula Zsivótzky took silver, Hungary's fourth medal in the last four Games in the men's hammer throw. Tadeusz Rut's bronze was Poland's first medal in the event.

Background

This was the 13th appearance of the event, which has been held at every Summer Olympics except 1896. Ten of the 15 finalists from the 1956 Games returned: gold medalist Hal Connolly of the United States, bronze medalist Anatoli Samotsvetov of the Soviet Union, fourth-place finisher Albert Hall of the United States, fifth-place finisher (and 1952 gold medalist) József Csermák of Hungary, sixth-place finisher Krešimir Račić of Yugoslavia, eighth-place finisher (and 1952 finalist) Sverre Strandli of Norway, eleventh-place finisher Muhammad Iqbal of Pakistan, thirteenth-place finisher Guy Husson of France, fourteenth-place finisher Tadeusz Rut of Poland, and Birger Asplund of Sweden, who did not make a legal mark in the final. Vasily Rudenkov of the Soviet Union was the favorite over defending champion Connolly.

Portugal and Spain each made their debut in the event; East and West Germany competed together as the United Team of Germany for the first time. The United States appeared for the 13th time, the only nation to have competed at each appearance of the event to that point.

Competition format

The competition used the two-round format introduced in 1936, with the qualifying round completely separate from the divided final. In qualifying, each athlete received three attempts; those recording a mark of at least 60.00 metres advanced to the final. If fewer than 12 athletes achieved that distance, the top 12 would advance. The results of the qualifying round were then ignored. Finalists received three throws each, with the top six competitors receiving an additional three attempts. The best distance among those six throws counted.

Records

Prior to this competition, the existing world and Olympic records were as follows:

The Olympic record was beaten by Gyula Zsivótzky in the qualifying round with a distance of 64.80 metres. Vasily Rudenkov bettered that with a distance of 67.03 metres. Anatoli Samotsvetov was better than the old record, but behind Rudenkov's new record.

In the final, Rudenkov bettered his own new record with 67.10 metres on his third throw. The top nine men in the final threw further than Connolly's old record, including Connolly himself (who finished eighth despite improving by 40 centimetres).

Schedule

All times are Central European Time (UTC+1)

Results

Qualifying round

Throwers achieving 60.00 metres advanced to the final.

Final

The six highest-ranked competitors after three rounds qualified for the final three throws to decide the medals.

References

External links
Olympic Games Official Report 1960 Rome-Volume I
Olympic Games Official Report 1960 Rome-Volume II

M
Hammer throw at the Olympics
Men's events at the 1960 Summer Olympics